Cirrhinus rubirostris is a species of cyprinid fish endemic to the Tenasserim River basin in southeastern Myanmar. It grows to  SL. It is fished for local consumption, and sold on small local markets.

References

Cirrhinus
Endemic fauna of Myanmar
Fish of Myanmar
Fish described in 1997